Charles Burton (born October 9, 1973) is an American wrestler. He competed in the men's freestyle 85 kg at the 2000 Summer Olympics.

References

External links
 

1973 births
Living people
American male sport wrestlers
Olympic wrestlers of the United States
Wrestlers at the 2000 Summer Olympics
People from Ontario, Oregon
Wrestlers from Oregon